Old Hutton and Holmescales is a civil parish in the South Lakeland District of Cumbria, England.  It contains eight listed buildings that are recorded in the National Heritage List for England.  Of these, one is listed at Grade II*, the middle of the three grades, and the others are at Grade II, the lowest grade.  The parish contains the village of Old Hutton and the hamlet of Middleshaw, and is otherwise entirely rural.  The listed buildings consist of three houses, a former gateway, three milestones and a boundary stone.


Key

Buildings

References

Citations

Sources

Lists of listed buildings in Cumbria